Horibata-chō (堀端町) is a historic neighbourhood located in the Nishi ward of Nagoya, central Japan.

History 
The area is located north of central enceinte across the moat of Nagoya Castle and west of the former Ofuke Garden, since 1931 Meijō Park. The northern border is delineated by the man-made Hori river. The whole area was the site of the New Palace (新御殿 Shin Goten) of Tokugawa Naritomo (1793–1850), 10th Lord of the Owari Domain. It not clear when the New Palace disappeared. 

The area is built over by residential housing and office buildings. 
The only green area left is the small Horibata Park (堀端公園), which was inaugurated in the early 1980's. A large part of the northern side along the river is occupied by the offices of the Sōka Gakkai and their Aichi Prefecture branch.

See also 
 Funairi-chō, Nagoya

References

External links 

Nagoya Castle
Nishi-ku, Nagoya
Neighbourhoods of Nagoya